Daknamstadion is a football stadium in the village Daknam, municipality Lokeren (Belgium). The stadium is the home ground of Lokeren-Temse and was the stadium of Sporting Lokeren before the club went bankrupt in 2020. Around 1980 the stadium could host 18,000 people, due to security reasons the stadium's capacity was reduced to 9,560. In 2014, the club expanded its stadium, which brings the stadium's current capacity at 12,136.

On 3 March 2010, it hosted an under 21 international between Belgium and Malta.

References

External links
Stadiumguide.com images

Multi-purpose stadiums in Belgium
Football venues in Flanders
Sports venues in East Flanders
Lokeren